Over the last few decades, transgender individuals have been elected to public office in larger numbers, although the increases have been slow and incremental. While transgender officials, like all politicians, bring their life experiences to their work, their policy goals are not limited to issues that focus transgender people.   At the same time, the election and appointment of transgender officials increases the visibility of the population, and the advocacy of those officials can help promote more transgender- positive laws and help remove discriminatory legislation.

North America

United States 
As of 2021, 77 transgender, non-binary, intersex, and otherwise non-cisgender officials serve in public elected positions. This represents a nearly 5 fold increase since 2018,  when only 16 openly transgender individuals had been elected to office in the United States. A few transgender individuals who have been elected were not open about their gender identity and were later outed.

1990s 
 Joanne Marie Conte, elected to Arvada, Colorado's City Council in 1991.
 Althea Garrison (R), Massachusetts House of Representatives from the 5th Suffolk District - 1992. Garrison is the first transgender person to serve in state legislation, however, not openly. She was later outed. In 2018, Garrison took office again when Ayanna Pressley was elected to the U.S. House of Representatives. She was appointed as the at-large representative for the City Council of Boston.

2000s 

 Amanda Simpson, Commissioner of the City of Tucson Gay, Lesbian, Bisexual and Transgender Commission - 2001. Later Simpson was elected or appointed to many different positions from Precinct Committeeperson up to serving as Deputy Assistant Secretary of Defense for Operational Energy from 2015 until January 2017.
Claire Elizabeth Hall, Commissioner of Lincoln County, Oregon - 2004. Hall transitioned in June 2018 while serving as commissioner.
Michelle Bruce, City Council Member of Riverdale, Georgia - 2004. Bruce was sued by her political opponents for fraud because she allegedly misled voters concerning her gender. The Georgia Supreme Court ruled in favor of Bruce.
Jessica Orsini, Alderwoman of the Centralia, Missouri Municipal Council - 2006.
 Kim Coco Iwamoto, Member of Hawaii Board of Education - 2006. Iwamoto was later appointed to the Hawaii Council of Human Affairs.
 Stu Rasmussen, Mayor of Silverton, Oregon - 2008.

2010s 
 Victoria Kolakowski, Superior Court Judge of Alameda County, California, Superior Court - 2010. First transgender person elected judge.
 Stacie Laughton, New Hampshire House of Representatives. Though Laughton was the first openly transgender person elected to state legislature, she was forced to resign before taking office after past felonies became public - 2012.
 Lauren Scott, Commissioner of Nevada Equal Rights Commission - 2012. First transgender person to win a Republican primary election for a state legislative office.
 Barbra Casbar Siperstein, Member of the Democratic National Committee (New Jersey) - 2012.
Vered Meltzer, City Council in Appleton, Wisconsin, District 2 - 2014.
Aime Wichtendahl - elected to the Hiawatha, Iowa, City Council - 2015. She is the first openly trans woman elected to government in Iowa.
 Jordan Evans, Board of Trustees of the Public Library for Charlton, Massachusetts - 2016.
 Jess Herbst, Mayor of New Hope, and first openly trans mayor to hold office in Texas, though not elected - 2016.
Jay Irwin, School Board Member of Ralston, Nebraska. First openly trans man to be elected to office - 2016.

2017 

Rachael Rose Luckey, Board Member of the Rampart Village Neighborhood Council, Los Angeles, CA - 2017.
Boudicca Walsh, an openly trans woman elected to the Thurston County Democrats.
Michelle Risher, Elected Chair of the Democratic Party of Oregon Stonewall (LGBTQ+) Caucus.  (DPO)
Betsy Driver, elected to Flemington (NJ) town council - First openly intersex person to be elected to office in the United States. Driver was later elected as mayor of Flemington, again the first openly intersex person to do so.

On November 7, 2017, eight transgender individuals were elected to public office. This is the most transgender individuals elected to office in a single day.
 Gerri Cannon, Somersworth (N.H.) School Board.
 Phillipe Cunningham, Minneapolis City Council, 4th Ward - First openly trans man of color to be elected to office.
 Danica Roem, Virginia House of Delegates, 13th District - First openly transgender person to both win election and be seated to a state legislature. Stacie Laughton had been elected in 2012, but resigned before being seated.
 Andrea Jenkins, Minneapolis City Council, 8th Ward - First openly transgender black woman to be elected to office.
 Stephe Koontz, Doraville City Council, 3rd District.
Lisa Middleton, Palm Springs City Council.
Tyler Titus, Erie City School District, School Board.
Raven Matherne, Stamford Board of Representatives.

2018
 Traci Baker, Secretary of Libertarian Party of Oklahoma - First transgender person elected in Oklahoma and first openly transgender person to be elected as a state level executive for a recognized political party in the United States
 Brianna Titone, Colorado House of Representatives, 27th District
 Gerri Cannon, New Hampshire House of Representatives, Strafford 18th District
 Lisa Bunker, New Hampshire House of Representatives, Rockingham 18th District
 Honey Mahogany, San Francisco Democratic County Central Committee, 17th District - First Black trans person to hold office in California.
Monika Nemeth, Neighborhood Commissioner, Washington D.C. Advisory Neighborhood Commission, 3F06 - First trans person to hold public office in Washington, D.C.    
Kathryn Ottersten, Fairbanks City Council, Alaska
Liz Lyke, Fairbanks North Star Borough Assembly, Alaska
 Pluto Brand, Vice Chair Indiana Green Party - First Transgender/Intersex person to be elected in the State of Indiana
 Venn Sage Wylde, Non-binary Precinct Committee Person, Multnomah County, Oregon

2019
Brianna Westbrook, Former Vice-chair of the Democratic Party of Arizona - First transgender person to be elected a vice-chair of a state Democratic Party.
Michelle Risher, First Vice-chair of the Democratic Party of Oregon (DPO) - First transgender person to be elected a first, senior, or second vice-chair of a state or territorial Democratic party and to be next in the line of succession to the party chair.
Brandy Fortson, member of the Corvallis, Oregon School Board (non-binary)
Ashley Shade, Treasurer of the Massachusetts Libertarian Party. She is the first transgender person to be elected treasurer of a Libertarian State Party and first elected Transgender State Party Officer in Massachusetts. Elected July 14, 2019.
Donna Price, Vice-chair of the Albemarle County, Virginia Board of Supervisors (Scottsville Magisterial District). The first transgender Supervisor and second elected public official in the State. Elected November 2019.
Aime Wichtendahl - is re-elected to the Hiawatha City Council, running unopposed.
Veronica Pejril, elected to the Greencastle, Indiana City Council, - the first openly transgender elected official in Indiana.
Air Rhodes, elected to the Beacon, New York Council, - the first openly LGBTQ elected official in Beacon.

2020
Rosemary Ketchum, elected to Wheeling, West Virginia's City Council on June 9, 2020. The first out trans person to be elected to public office in the State. Elected June 2020.
Pluto Brand, elected to State Chair of the Indiana Green Party. First Trans/Intersex person to be the leader of a State Political Party in the State of Indiana, 2018 Elected Vice-chair of the Indiana Green Party
Blaizen Bloom, Elected to Press-Secretary of the Green Party of Virginia. Elected August 8, 2020. (non-binary/gender fluid)
Taylor Small, Elected to Vermont House of Representatives, representing Winooski and Burlington (Chittenden 6-7 district).
Christopher Kalcich, Elected to Selinsgrove, Pennsylvania's Borough Council. The first transgender elected official in Snyder County and Central PA.
Honey Mahogany, San Francisco Democratic County Central Committee, 17th District - 3rd Vice Chair - First black trans person elected in the State of California.
Sarah McBride, elected to the Delaware state senate on November 3, 2020, and sworn on January 12, 2021. First transgender state senator in United States history.
Michelle Risher, Elected to the Democratic National Committee (DNC) by the Democratic Party of Oregon's state central committee. Risher is only the second transgender Democrat elected to the DNC and the first to be their state party's only elected female DNC member.
Mauree Turner, elected to the Oklahoma State House of Representatives. They are the first non-binary state legislator.

2021
Ashley Shade, Chair of the Massachusetts Libertarian Party. She is the first transgender person to be elected Chair of a State Party in Massachusetts. Elected March 20, 2021.
Blaizen Bloom, Elected to Non-Male Cochair of the Green Party of Virginia. Elected April 5, 2021. (non-binary/gender fluid)
Rachel Nyx, Vice Chair of the Libertarian Party of California. She is the first openly transgender person to be elected Vice Chair of a State Party in California. Elected May 16, 2021.
Ashley Shade, Elected to City Council North Adams, Massachusetts November 2, 2021. She is the first transgender person to be elected in North Adams and in Berkshire County, Massachusetts.
Lisa Middleton, previously a city council member of Palm Springs, was elected mayor of Palm Springs in late 2021.

2022 
 Pluto Brand, Elected to State Chair of the Indiana Green Party. First Trans/Intersex person to be the leader of a State Political Party in the State of Indiana see 2020 Elected Chair of the Indiana Green Party, 2018 Elected Vice-chair of the Indiana Green Party 
 Rebecca Blankenship, member of the Berea Community School Board. She is the first openly transgender elected official in Kentucky.
 Zooey Zephyr, Elected to the 100th District of the Montana House of Representatives.  She is the first openly transgender elected official in the Montana Legislature.

Canada 

 Uzoma Asagwara, member of the Legislative Assembly of Manitoba - 2019.
 Jamie Lee Hamilton, Board of directors of the Greater Vancouver Native Cultural Society - 2008.
 Catherine McKenney, Ottawa City Councilor - 2014.
 Micheline Montreuil, Member of the NDP Federal Council - 2008.
Estefania Cortes-Vargas, member of the Legislative Assembly of Alberta - 2015–2019.
Lisa Lachance, member of the Nova Scotia Legislative Assembly - 2021. (genderqueer) 
 Julie Lemieux, Mayor of Très-Saint-Rédempteur in Quebec and first openly transgender mayor in Canada - 2017.
 Lyra Evans, School Board Trustee in Ottawa was the first openly transgender school trustee in Canada; previously a candidate for member of provincial parliament in Ontario - 2018.
 Amita Kuttner, interim leader of the Green Party of Canada
 Blake Desjarlais, MP for Edmonton Griesbach and the first openly two-spirit individual to serve in Parliament - 2021

Cuba 
 Adela Hernández, Municipal Council of Caibarién in the Ville Clara Province - 2012.

Trinidad and Tobago 
 Jowelle de Souza, sworn into the Senate of Trinidad and Tobago on February 15, 2022. First transgender parliamentarian in Caribbean history.

South America

Argentina 

Mara Pérez Reynoso, holder of the non-discrimination area in the Ministry of Security, first transgender public official in Argentina's government - 2016.

Bolivia 
 París Galán, first trans person to win elective office - 2015.

Brazil 

Érica Malunguinho da Silva, first trans person elected to a State Congress - 2018.
Duda Salabert, first trans city councilor elected in Belo Horizonte - 2020.

Chile 

Alejandra González, Councilwoman for Lampa - 2004.
Zuliana Araya, Councilwoman for Valparaiso - 2016.
 Emilia Schneider, Congresswoman for district 10 - 2022.

Ecuador 

 Diane Marie Rodríguez Zambrano, alternate member of the National Assembly representing Guayas Province - 2017.

Peru 

Luisa Revilla Urcia, Councillor in La Esperanza in the province of Trujillo - 2014.

Uruguay 

 Michelle Suarez Bertora, Uruguayan Parliament - 2014.

Venezuela 

 Tamara Adrián, National Assembly of Venezuela - 2015.

Europe

Germany 

 Christian Schenk, Member of the Bundestag for the Independent Women's Association Party and later the Party of Democratic Socialism - 1990–2002.
 Nyke Slawik, member of the Bundestag for Alliance 90/The Greens.
 Tessa Ganserer, member of the Bundestag for Alliance 90/The Greens.

France 

 Camille Cabral, Council of the 17th arrondissement of Paris - 2001.
Marie Cau, first openly transgender mayor in France

United Kingdom 

 Jenny Bailey, Civic Leader of Cambridge City Council East Chesterton ward (councilor) - 2002.
 Nikki Sinclaire, Member of the European Parliament for the West Midlands - 2009.
 Sarah Brown, Member of Cambridge City Council for Petersfield - 2010.
 Anwen Muston, Member of Wolverhampton City Council for East Park - 2016.
Sarah Fanet, Member of Highland Council/Comhairle na Gàidhealtachd for Fort William & Ardnamurchan - 2021.
Jamie Wallis, Member of Parliament for Bridgend - 2022.
Little Brighouse, Non-binary member of Powys County Council for Disserth and Trecoed with Newbridge - 2022.

Iceland 

 Alexandra Briem, elected President of the Reykjavík City Council on 18 May 2021.

Italy 

 Vladimir Luxuria, Chamber of Deputies by the Lazio 1 constituency in Rome (Member of Parliament in Europe) - 2006.
 Gianmarco Negri, mayor of Tromello, Province of Pavia - 2019.

Spain 

 Manuela Trasobares, Town Councilor in Geldo - 2007.
 Carla Antonelli, Deputy in the Assembly of Madrid for the Spanish Socialists Workers Party (PSOE) - 2011.

Sweden 
 Lina Axelsson Kihlblom, Minister for Schools in Andersson Cabinet.
 Alexandra Ward-Slotte, Councillor in the municipality of Stenungsund for the liberal-conservative Moderate party. LGBTQ-activist and Vice president of west pride.
Lukas Romson, Swedish politician for the Socialdemocratic party. Brother of Åsa Romson, former deputy prime minister.
 Mia Mulder, Councillor in the municipality of Sollentuna for the Left Party.

Poland 

 Anna Grodzka, Member of Parliament in Poland (Sejm) - 2011.

Portugal 

 Júlia Mendes Pereira, Member of the Left Bloc national board - 2014–2018.

Belgium 

 Petra De Sutter, Belgian Senate member - 2014. Belgian Minister for Civil Servants and Government Institutions - 2020

Netherlands 

 Lisa van Ginneken, Member of the Dutch House of Representatives - 2021.

Asia

India 

Shabnam Bano (aka Shabnam "Mausi"), Member of the Madhya Pradesh State Legislative Assembly - 1998.
Kamla Jaan, Mayor of Katni, central Madhya Pradesh. Elected in 2000, she was India's first transgender mayor. In 2002, a judge in Madhya Pradesh ruled that she was legally male and could not hold an office reserved for women.
Asha Devi, Mayor of Gorakhpur, eastern Uttar Pradesh - 2001.
Kamla Kinnar (aka Kamla "Bua"), Mayor of Sagar, Madhya Pradesh - 2009.
 Madhu Kinnar, Mayor of the Raigarh Municipal Corporation - 2015.

Indonesia
Kety Haji Jalla, member of the People's Representative Council (2009-2014) for North Maluku.
Hendrika Mayora Victoria, member of the Village Representative Council for Habi Village, East Nusa Tenggara.

Japan 

 Aya Kamikawa, transgender female assembly member for Tokyo’s Setagaya ward - 2003.
 Tomoya Hosoda, transgender male city council member of the city of Iruma in the Saitama Prefecture - 2017.
 Maria Akasaka, transgender female assembly member in the Kameoka City Council member in Kyoto Prefecture - 2019.
 Ayako Fuchigami, transgender female assembly member in the Hokkaido Prefectural Assembly representing Sapporo's Higashi-ku ward - 2019.

Taiwan 

 Audrey Tang, Minister for Digital Affairs - 2016

Thailand 

 Yollada Suanyot, representative of Mueang Nan District on the Provincial Administration Organization for Nan Province - 2012.
 Tanwarin Sukkhapisit, first openly transgender MP in the House of Representatives.

Malaysia 

 Hazreen Shaik Daud, transgender woman, political secretary of Teh Yee Cheu from the Democratic Action Party representing Tanjung Bungah in the Penang State Legislative Assembly - 2013.
 Rania Zara Medina, transgender woman, trans health consultant by the Ministry of Health Malaysia in the Country Coordinating Mechanism committee.

Sri Lanka 

 Niluka Ekanayake, Governor of Central Province - 2016–2018, Governor of Sabaragamuwa Province April 2018- December 2018.

Philippines 

 Geraldine B. Roman, Representative of the 1st District of Bataan - 2016.

Oceania

Australia  

 Erin Moroney, Campbelltown City Council, NSW
 Jade Darko, Clarence City Council, TAS
 Jax Fox, Hobart City Council, TAS

New Zealand  

 Georgina Beyer, Carterton District Council and later a seat in Parliament - 1993.

References

Lists of transgender people
transgender